Australasian Agribusiness Review is a peer-reviewed academic journal in the field of agribusiness. One of the initial co-editors was Bill Schroder.

References

External links 
  
 

Agricultural journals